Toomey is a surname, and may refer to:

People
Bill Toomey (born 1939), American Olympic track and field athlete
George Toomey (fl. 1900–1901), American college football coach
Harold D. Toomey (1898–1953), New York politician
Jenny Toomey (born 1968), American rock musician and arts activist
Jim Toomey (born 1960), American syndicated cartoonist (Sherman’s Lagoon)
Marie Toomey (fl. 1946–1950), Australian tennis player
Nicole Toomey (born 2002), New Zealand international lawn bowler
Pat Toomey (born 1961), Republican politician from Pennsylvania; U.S. representative 1999–2005 and U.S. senator 2011–2023
Paul Toomey (born 1956) American professional soccer player
Regis Toomey (1898–1991), American film and television actor
Robyn Toomey (born 1964), New Zealand field hockey player
Sean Toomey (born 1979), American professional ice hockey player
Timothy J. Toomey, Jr. (born 1953), American politician from Massachusetts; state legislator since 1992
Tia-Clair Toomey (born 1993) Australian weightlifter and CrossFit athlete

Fictional characters
Claire Toomey, character in the British soap opera Family Affairs
Craig Toomey, character in the American sci-fi miniseries The Langoliers